Otho (32–69 AD) was an emperor of the Roman Empire.

Otho may also refer to:

People
 Lucius Salvius Otho, father of Roman emperor Otho
 Variant of the German name Otto
 Otho, a saint and companion in martyrdom to Berard of Carbio
 Otto of Greece (1815–1867), King of Greece
 Otho Clark (1889–1974), American football player
 Otho Davis (1934–2000), trainer for the Baltimore Colts
 Lord Otho FitzGerald (1827–1882), member of the British Parliament
 Otho Nitcholas (1908–1986), American baseball player
 Otho Prior-Palmer (1897–1986), member of the British Parliament for Worthing
 Valentinus Otho or Valentin Otto (died 1603), German mathematician and astronomer
 Otho de Lagery, Pope Urban II
 Otto of Montferrat (disambiguation), several people whose names were anglicized as Otho

Others
Otho, Alabama, United States
Otho, Iowa, United States
short for the Otho-Corpus Gospels, a fragmentary illuminated manuscript
Otho, a character in the Deverry Cycle book series

See also 
 Otto (disambiguation)